Fairdale may refer to one of the following places:

Australia 
 Fairdale, Queensland, a locality in the South Burnett Region, Queensland

South Africa 
 Fairdale, Cape Town

United States 
 Fairdale, Illinois
 Fairdale, Indiana
 Fairdale, Louisville, Kentucky
 Fairdale, North Dakota
 Fairdale, Pennsylvania

See also
 Fairfield (disambiguation)